Leonard Daniel Wickenden (March 24, 1913 – October 27, 1989) was an American author and editor. Notable works include The Running of the Deer, The Wayfarers and The Amazing Vacation.

Biography 
Wickenden was born by English-born parents in Tyrone, Pennsylvania and grew up in Long Island. He graduated from Amherst College in 1935. At the early stages of his career, he published short stories on Vanity Fair and The New Yorker.

His first significant contribution as a novelist was The Running of the Deer, a best-selling book about two families from Long Island. He revisited the theme of family life for his next novel, Walk Like a Mortal.
He spent a 10-month period in Panajachel, Guatemala, living in a village next to Lake Atitlán with other artists. He returned to the United States in May 1948.

In 1953 he became associate editor at book publisher Harcourt Brace. He eventually became senior editor, and he worked with notable authors that included Eudora Welty, James Gould Cozzens, and Wendell Berry. He retired in 1978, but he continued work in consulting and editing as a freelancer. He died of heart attack at his residence in Weston, Connecticut on October 27, 1989.

Works 
 The Running of the Deer (1937)
 Walk Like a Mortal (1940)
 The Wayfarers (1945)
 Tobias Brandywine (1948)
 The Dry Season (1950 )
 The Red Carpet (1952)
 The Amazing Vacation (1956)

References

External Links 

 Leonard Daniel (Dan) Wickenden (AC 1935) Papers from the Amherst College Archives & Special Collections

1913 births
1989 deaths
People from Tyrone, Pennsylvania
American book editors
20th-century American male writers
20th-century American writers
 American people of English descent
Amherst College alumni